The 1983 Virginia Slims Championships was a tennis tournament played on indoor carpet courts at Madison Square Garden in New York City, New York in the United States. It was the 12th edition of the year-end singles championships, the 8th edition of the year-end doubles championships, and was part of the 1983 Virginia Slims World Championship Series. The tournament was held from March 14 through March 20, 1983. First-seeded Martina Navratilova won the singles event and the accompanying $80,000 first prize money.

Champions

Singles

 Martina Navratilova defeated  Chris Evert-Lloyd, 6–2, 6–0
 It was Navratilova's 9th title of the year and the 156th of her career.

Doubles

 Martina Navratilova /  Pam Shriver defeated  Claudia Kohde-Kilsch /  Eva Pfaff, 7–5, 6–2
 It was Navratilova's 10th title of the year and the 157th of her career. It was Shriver's 5th title of the year and the 39th of her career.

See also
 Evert–Navratilova rivalry

References

External links
 

Virginia Slims Championships
WTA Tour Championships
Virginia Slims Championships
Virginia Slims Championships
1980s in Manhattan
Virginia Slims Championships
Madison Square Garden
Sports competitions in New York City
Sports in Manhattan
Tennis tournaments in New York City